A player-coach is a member of team who simultaneously holds both playing and coaching duties. The term can be used to refer to both players who serve as head coaches or as assistant coaches. In the National Basketball Association (NBA), there have been 40 players who also served as their teams' head coaches at the same time. The NBA was founded in 1946 as the Basketball Association of America (BAA). The league adopted its current name at the start of the  when it merged with the National Basketball League (NBL). The ruling was established to avoid the possibility that a team would circumvent the cap by signing a player as a player-coach, as coaches' salaries are not counted under the cap.

Ed Sadowski was the first player-coach in the league. In the BAA's inaugural season, he played for the Toronto Huskies and also served as the team's first head coach. Buddy Jeannette was the first player-coach to win the championship; he won the 1948 BAA Finals with the Baltimore Bullets. Bill Russell is the only other player-coach who has won the championship, as well as the only player-coach to win multiple championships. In , he took over the Boston Celtics' head coaching duties from Red Auerbach, becoming the first African American head coach in the league. He served as the Celtics' player-coach for three seasons, winning two consecutive NBA championships in 1968 and 1969. Dave Cowens is the last player-coach in the league. He coached the Celtics in the  before relinquishing his coaching duty to focus on his playing career.

Richie Guerin had coached 372 games as a player-coach, the most among the other player-coaches. However, he came back from retirement to play in the following two seasons while still serving as the Hawks' head coach. Lenny Wilkens, who is in second place for highest number of games as a player-coach, was the only player-coach who has been employed by more than one team. He spent three seasons as the Seattle SuperSonics' player-coach and one season as the Portland Trail Blazers' player-coach. He is the only player-coach who has been inducted to the Naismith Memorial Basketball Hall of Fame as both a player and a coach. Other than Wilkens, twelve player-coaches have been inducted as players while two player-coaches have been inducted as coaches. The Coach of the Year Award was never won by a player-coach.

Wilkens went on to become the longest-tenured head coach in the league. In addition to 4 seasons as a player-coach, he spent another 28 seasons as a head coach, winning an NBA championship in 1979. San Francisco Warriors player-coach Al Attles retired from playing duty in 1971, but continued to coach the Warriors for another 12 seasons, leading them to an NBA championship in 1975. Alex Hannum, Red Holzman and Kevin Loughery, who served as player-coaches for less than a season, had a lengthy coaching career in the NBA which lasted more than 10 seasons. Hannum spent 11 seasons as a full-time head coach, winning two NBA championships with two different teams. Holzman coached the Hawks for 4 seasons, including a season as a player-coach, and the New York Knicks for 14 seasons. He led the latter to two NBA championships. Loughery served as the head coach for six NBA teams during his 18-year coaching career, including a year as a player-coach. Wilkens and Holzman were named among the Top 10 Coaches in NBA History announced at the league's 50th anniversary in 1996. Wilkens, along with Bob Cousy, Dave Cowens, Dave DeBusschere, Bob Pettit, Bill Russell and Dolph Schayes, were named to the list of the 50 Greatest Players in NBA History, which was also announced at the league's 50th anniversary.

Key

Player-coaches

Notes

 Each year is linked to an article about that particular BAA / NBA season.
 Each year is linked to an article about the BAA / NBA Finals in that year.
 Each year is linked to an article about that particular BAA / NBA season or the NBA All-Star Game in that year.
 The original Baltimore Bullets, who folded in 1954, are not affiliated with the present-day Washington Wizards, who were known as the Baltimore / Capital / Washington Bullets from 1963 to 1997.
 The original Denver Nuggets, who folded in 1950, are not affiliated with the present-day Denver Nuggets, who were founded in 1967 as a member of American Basketball Association (ABA).
 The Anderson Packers, who folded in 1950, are not affiliated with the present-day Washington Wizards, who were known as the Chicago Packers from 1961 to 1962.
 The Waterloo Hawks, who folded in 1950, are not affiliated with the present-day Atlanta Hawks, who were also known as the Milwaukee / St. Louis Hawks from 1951 to 1968.

References

See also
List of National Basketball Association players
List of National Basketball Association head coaches with 400 games coached

PlayerB